This is a list of newspapers in Kiribati.

Kiribati Independent: private, fortnightly; circulation 500
Kiribati Times: weekly
Kiribati Voice: weekly, close to Teburoro Tito
The Kiribati Newstar: private, weekly, owned by Ieremia Tabai
Tarakai: weekly, owned by the Fishermen's Association
Te Mauri: weekly, religious (Protestant, KUC)
Te Uekera: state-owned, published twice-weekly; circulation c. 1,500 per week

See also
Media in Kiribati
List of newspapers

References

Kiribati
Newspapers
Newspapers
Newspapers